Dave Brubeck and Jay & Kai at Newport is a split live album featuring selections from Dave Brubeck's Quartet with Paul Desmond and the J. J. Johnson/Kai Winding Quintet performances at the 1956 Newport Jazz Festival which was released on the Columbia label.

Critical reception

Allmusic awarded the album 2½ stars and stated "Overall, this album gives one a good look at two of the most popular jazz groups of 1956".

Track listing
 "In Your Own Sweet Way" (Dave Brubeck) - 9:31
 "Two Part Contention" (Brubeck) - 11:11
 "Take the "A" Train" (Billy Strayhorn) - 6:04
 "I'm in a Dancing Mood" (Al Goodhart, Al Hoffman, Maurice Sigler) - 4:36
 "Lover, Come Back to Me" (Sigmund Romberg, Oscar Hammerstein II) - 5:32 	
 "True Blue Tromboniums" (Kai Winding) - 4:17
 "NWPT" (J. J. Johnson) - 3:04

Personnel

Tracks 1-4 
Dave Brubeck – piano
Paul Desmond – alto saxophone
Norman Bates – bass
Joe Dodge – drums

Tracks 5-7 
J. J. Johnson, Kai Winding – trombone, trombonium
Dick Katz – piano
Bill Crow – bass
Rudy Collins – drums

References

Columbia Records live albums
Dave Brubeck live albums
J. J. Johnson live albums
Kai Winding live albums
1956 live albums
Albums produced by George Avakian
Albums recorded at the Newport Jazz Festival